Ha Jong-hwa (born 28 August 1969) is a South Korean volleyball player. He competed at the 1992 Summer Olympics and the 1996 Summer Olympics.

References

1969 births
Living people
South Korean men's volleyball players
Olympic volleyball players of South Korea
Volleyball players at the 1992 Summer Olympics
Volleyball players at the 1996 Summer Olympics
Place of birth missing (living people)
Asian Games medalists in volleyball
Asian Games silver medalists for South Korea
Asian Games bronze medalists for South Korea
Volleyball players at the 1990 Asian Games
Volleyball players at the 1994 Asian Games
Medalists at the 1990 Asian Games
Medalists at the 1994 Asian Games
20th-century South Korean people